Luderin Lawrence Darbone (January 14, 1913 – November 21, 2008), was a Cajun-Western swing fiddle player for the band Hackberry Ramblers.

Early life
Darbone was born in Evangeline Parish, Louisiana. He was the son of Edvard "Eddie" Darbone.  He credited his longevity and inspiration to his wife Mary Lou. He was born in Evangeline and raised in Orangefield, Texas. His parents gave him his first fiddle at the age of 12 and he learned to play through a correspondence course.

Career
In 1930 he met guitarist Edwin Duhon and together they formed the nucleus of a band they named the Hackberry Ramblers in honor of their hometown.  By 1933 they were on the radio and signed with RCA Bluebird Records. In 1936, they recorded "Jolie Blonde", "Oh Josephine, Ma Josephine", "One Step De L'Amour" and "Faux Pas Tu Bray Cherie". Darbone and Duhon were the first musicians to bring electronic amplification to area dance halls, running a public address system off the idling engine of Darbone's Model-A Ford. Their eclectic repertoire included Cajun music, country music and Western swing, jazz music, and blues music. Due to a sponsorship deal with Montgomery Ward, the band adopted the name "The Riverside Ramblers".

In 2002, Darbone and Duhon received a prestigious National Heritage Fellowship from the Folk Arts Program of the National Endowment for the Arts.

Darbone died on November 21, 2008, in Sulphur, Louisiana.

See also
History of Cajun Music
List of Notable People Related to Cajun Music

References

External links

 Luderin Darbone recordings at the Discography of American Historical Recordings.

1913 births
2008 deaths
Cajun fiddlers
People from Evangeline Parish, Louisiana
20th-century American violinists
National Heritage Fellowship winners